Charles Cunningham was an officer of the Royal Navy.

Charles Cunningham may also refer to:

 Charles Cunningham (civil servant) (1906–1998), Scottish civil servant
 Charles E. Cunningham (1823–1895), American politician; Union Labor Party's nominee for Vice President of the United States, 1888
 Charles J. Cunningham (born 1932), U.S. Air Force general
 Charles Milton Cunningham (1877–1936), politician, attorney and newspaper publisher in Louisiana
 Charles Orin Cunningham (1872–1942), provincial politician from Alberta, Canada
 Charlie Cunningham (born 1948), mountain biker from Fairfax, California
 Charlie Cunningham (footballer) (1890–1942), English footballer
 Charlie Cunningham (jockey) (1849–1906), 19th century Scottish Grand National winning jockey
 Charlie Cunningham (musician), singer-songwriter and guitarist from Bedfordshire, England
"Chuck Cunningham", a character who appeared in the first two seasons of the sitcom Happy Days

See also
 Charles Cunningham Boycott, British land agent